In enzymology, a gamma-guanidinobutyraldehyde dehydrogenase is an enzyme that catalyzes the chemical reaction

4-guanidinobutanal + NAD+ + H2O  4-guanidinobutanoate + NADH + 2 H+

The 3 substrates of this enzyme are 4-guanidinobutanal, NAD+, and H2O, whereas its 3 products are 4-guanidinobutanoate, NADH, and H+.

This enzyme belongs to the family of oxidoreductases, specifically those acting on the aldehyde or oxo group of donor with NAD+ or NADP+ as acceptor.  The systematic name of this enzyme class is 4-guanidinobutanal:NAD+ 1-oxidoreductase. Other names in common use include alpha-guanidinobutyraldehyde dehydrogenase, 4-guanidinobutyraldehyde dehydrogenase, and GBAL dehydrogenase.  This enzyme participates in urea cycle and metabolism of amino groups.

References

 

EC 1.2.1
NADH-dependent enzymes
Enzymes of unknown structure